João Pedro do Espírito Santo Gonçalves (born 18 January 1988) is a Portuguese former footballer who played as a right back.

Club career
Born in Amadora, Lisbon, Gonçalves joined Sporting CP's youth system at only eight, but never appeared for the club officially, being loaned for the duration of his spell. He represented C.D. Olivais e Moscavide (third division), S.C. Olhanense (Segunda Liga and Primeira Liga) and Vitória de Guimarães (top tier).

Gonçalves spent three of his four years with Algarve's Olhanense in the top flight, appearing in 21 games in the 2010–11 season (all starts, one goal against Vitória de Setúbal in a 3–1 home win) to help his team rank in 11th place. He retired in June 2013 at the age of only 25, due to recurrent knee injuries.

International career
Gonçalves won 48 caps for Portugal across all youth levels, including nine for the under-21 side.

References

External links

1988 births
Living people
People from Amadora
Portuguese footballers
Association football defenders
Primeira Liga players
Liga Portugal 2 players
Segunda Divisão players
Sporting CP footballers
C.D. Olivais e Moscavide players
S.C. Olhanense players
Sporting CP B players
Vitória S.C. players
Portugal youth international footballers
Portugal under-21 international footballers
Sportspeople from Lisbon District